Shelter Island is a hamlet and census-designated place (CDP) within the Town of Shelter Island in Suffolk County, New York, United States. The population was 1,333 at the 2010 census. The village of Dering Harbor and the CDP of Shelter Island Heights make up the rest of the town.

The community of Shelter Island is at the eastern end of Long Island and is reachable only by ferry. Many of the properties are owned by wealthy New York City residents who use the island as a weekend retreat. Shelter Island is characterized by a quieter and less social lifestyle than that of the nearby Hamptons.

Geography
Shelter Island is located at  (41.062171, -72.328003).

Demographics

As of the census of 2000, there were 1,234 people, 531 households, and 349 families residing in the CDP. The population density was 188.8 per square mile (72.9/km2). There were 964 housing units at an average density of 147.5/sq mi (56.9/km2). The racial makeup of the CDP was 94.89% White, 1.05% Black or African American, 0.57% Asian, 0.16% from other races, and 3.32% from two or more races. Hispanic or Latino of any race were 3.24% of the population.

There were 531 households, out of which 23.7% had children under the age of 18 living with them, 53.9% were married couples living together, 8.5% had a female householder with no husband present, and 34.1% were non-families. 27.9% of all households were made up of individuals, and 15.3% had someone living alone who was 65 years of age or older. The average household size was 2.32 and the average family size was 2.86.

In the CDP, the population was spread out, with 20.7% under the age of 18, 4.6% from 18 to 24, 24.9% from 25 to 44, 26.8% from 45 to 64, and 22.9% who were 65 years of age or older. The median age was 45 years. For every 100 females, there were 95.3 males. For every 100 females age 18 and over, there were 94.0 males.

The median income for a household in the CDP was $43,625, and the median income for a family was $55,764. Males had a median income of $40,493 versus $34,688 for females. The per capita income for the CDP was $27,202. About 4.9% of families and 9.0% of the population were below the poverty line, including 19.4% of those under age 18 and none of those age 65 or over.

References

Shelter Island (town), New York
Census-designated places in New York (state)
Hamlets in New York (state)
Census-designated places in Suffolk County, New York
Hamlets in Suffolk County, New York